Tabernaemontana africana is a species of plant in the Apocynaceae family. It is found in tropical Africa. It is an evergreen perennial shrub with a maximum height of 6 meters. The plant can be used to produce latex, soap and dye.

References

africana